The 8th Annual GMA Dove Awards were held on 1976 recognizing accomplishments of musicians for the year 1975. The show was held in Nashville, Tennessee.

External links
 

GMA Dove Awards
1976 music awards
1976 in American music
1976 in Tennessee
GMA